The Giordano Bruno Foundation (abbreviated: gbs) is a Germany-based non-profit foundation under public law that promotes evolutionary humanism and the enlightenment. It was founded by entrepreneur Herbert Steffen in 2004 and was named after Giordano Bruno. Spokesperson is Michael Schmidt-Salomon. The foundation has more than 10,000 supporting members and 50 regional and university groups.

Goals 
The Giordano Bruno Foundation advocates the position of Evolutionary Humanism, as formulated in the Manifesto of Evolutionary Humanism, which was published by Michael Schmidt-Salomon in 2005 and sold around 50,000 copies. In the manifesto, Schmidt-Salomon pleads for a naturalistic philosophy. He starts from a naturalistic concept of the cosmos in which there are no interventions of supernatural creatures (e. g. gods, demons, witches or goblins) in world events by way of miracles. The manifesto outlines, that humanity will be able to create more life-friendly, free, and just conditions than can be found today. The concept can be traced to the work of Julian Huxley, the first UNESCO Director General and a major contributor to the Universal Declaration of Human Rights.

Activities
Starting with the 2005 series of events “Heathen fun rather than Hell’s torture” (“Heidenspaß statt Höllenqual”) on the occasion of the Catholic World Youth Day in Cologne, the gbs has been addressing a wide range of topics around humanism, enlightenment and the principles of a scientific world view in many highly publicized campaigns and events. A chronology and the documentary "In Humanity We Trust – The story of evolutionary humanism" provide information on the most important events in the history of the foundation. The gbs und its regional and university groups organize about 150 events per year throughout Germany.

In 2007, the gbs supported the founding of the Central Council of Ex-Muslims (German: Zentralrat der Ex-Muslime), which inspired similar movements in other countries; in 2012, the campaign “Against Religious Discrimination at the Workplace” (German: Gegen religiöse Diskriminierung am Arbeitsplatz, GerDiA); in 2013, the project Evokids - Evolution in Primary School; in 2017, the founding of the Institute for Secular Law (German: Institut für Weltanschauungsrecht, ifw); and in 2017, the founding of the Atheist Refugee Relief (German: Säkulare Flüchtlingshilfe).

Funding 
The gbs is funded by private donors and publishes information on its annual financial data and its assets. In 2018, the total assets were around 4,000,000 euros. The expenditure in 2018 was 628,000 euros, mainly for events and projects.

Board of directors
The board of directors consists of Herbert Steffen and Michael Schmidt-Salomon. Managing director is Elke Held and the foundation has 14 employees and scholars. The board of trustees consists of Thorsten Barnickel, Ricarda Hinz, Jacqueline Neumann, Rainer Rosenzweig und Assunta Tammelleo.

Advisory board 
The advisory board is composed by around 30 scientists, philosophers and artists, including:

Deschner Prize
From its beginnings the foundation has been particularly committed to the work of Karlheinz Deschner. It awards the "Deschner Prize” at the sum of 10,000 euros for outstanding achievements relating to the criticism of religion and ideology. The prize was awarded to Richard Dawkins (2007) and to Raif Badawi and his wife Ensaf Haidar (2016).

References

External links
 Giordano Bruno Foundation (in English)
 Giordano Bruno Foundation (in German)

Skeptic organisations in Germany
Giordano Bruno
Organizations established in 2004